Rafał Janicki (born 5 July 1992 in Szczecin) is a Polish professional footballer who plays as a centre-back for Ekstraklasa club Górnik Zabrze.

Career

Club
He is trainee of Chemik Police. In July 2010, he moved to Lechia Gdańsk on a three-year contract deal.

On 14 July 2017 he was loaned for two years to Ekstraklasa side Lech Poznań.

National
He was a part of Poland national under-19 football team. Janicki got his first call up to the senior Poland squad for friendlies against Georgia and Greece in June 2015.

Janicki was also a part of the under-20 squad in 2011 and later from 2013 to 2014 also the under-21 squad.

Career statistics

Club

References

External links
 
 

1992 births
Living people
Polish footballers
Ekstraklasa players
II liga players
III liga players
Lechia Gdańsk players
Lech Poznań players
Lech Poznań II players
Wisła Kraków players
Podbeskidzie Bielsko-Biała players
Górnik Zabrze players
Sportspeople from Szczecin
Association football defenders
KP Chemik Police players
Poland youth international footballers
Poland under-21 international footballers